The Volcanic Hills are a mountain range in Esmeralda County, Nevada.

References 

Mountain ranges of Nevada
Mountain ranges of the Great Basin
Mountain ranges of Esmeralda County, Nevada